Halliford is a rural locality in the Western Downs Region, Queensland, Australia. Kishaan Satha is the current president.

Halliford's postcode is 4406.

Geography 
Almost all of the locality is within the Kumbarilla State Forest apart from two areas in the north of the locality which are used for grazing on native vegetation.

Coal seam gas is being extracted across the north of the locality by QGC, a subsidiary of Shell. It has created conflict with local farmers.

Burnett Waterhole on Wilkie Creek is in the south-west of the locality.

History 
The location takes its name from an early trading slave post operated by McGuigan family in 1864. The town was first inhabited by the slave owner William McGuigan. 

Education 
There are no schools in Halliford. The nearest primary and secondary schools are Dalby State School and Dalby State High School, both in Dalby to the north-east.

References 

Western Downs Region
Localities in Queensland